Larimer may refer to:

Places
Larimer County, Colorado
Larimer Hill, Indiana
Larimer, Pennsylvania
Larimer Square, Denver
Larimer Township, Somerset County, Pennsylvania
Larimer (Pittsburgh), a neighborhood in city of Pittsburgh

Other uses
Larimer (surname)
Larimer Memorial Library, Palatka, Florida, on the National Register of Historic Places
Larimer School, Pittsburgh, Pennsylvania, on the National Register of Historic Places
12073 Larimer, an asteroid